Fritz Süffert (1891–1945) was a German entomologist who specialised in studies of butterflies.

Fritz Süffert was an expert on adaptive colouration. He died in the Battle of Berlin.

Works
Süffert, F. (1925): Geheime Gesetzmässigkeiten in der Zeichnung der Schmetterlinge Revue suisse de Zoologie 32(10), pp. 107–111
Süffert, F. (1926): Die Flügelschuppen der Schmetterlinge, ihr Bau und ihre Farben Mikroskopie für Naturfreunde 4(1), pp. 1–9, figs. 1-2; (3) 65-77, pl. 4, figs. 3, 5-7.
Süffert, F. (1927): Zur vergleichenden Analyse der Schmetterlingszeichnung, "Biol. Zentralbl." 47, 1927, pp. 385–413.
Süffert, F. (1929): Morphologische Erscheinungsgruppen in der Flügelzeichnung der Schmetterlinge, insbesondere die Querbindenzeichnung - Wilhelm Roux' Archiv für Entwicklungsmechanik der Organismen 120, pp. 299–383, 51 figs.

German lepidopterists
1891 births
1945 deaths
20th-century German zoologists
German civilians killed in World War II